Flaming Red is Patty Griffin's second album. It was released on June 23, 1998, and reached number 12 on the Top Heatseekers chart. According to Billboard, the album has sold 122,000 copies in the U.S. up to May 2004.

Critical reception

Of the album, Griffin herself commented, "I always felt like I was a rock singer. It was all I listened to. I felt like, 'Don't call me a folksinger.'"  Called "rock-centric", "incendiary" and "full-bodied", the album marked a shift to recording with a full band. Stephen Thomas Erlewine of AllMusic writes, "Flaming Red is evidence that Griffin is one [of] the more talented and ambitious singer/songwriters to emerge in the late '90s." 

NPR named the album to their list of 150 Greatest Albums Made By Women calling it "electrifying" and a "testament to the fire simmering under all of [Griffin's] work preceding this album, and what came after it."

Track listing

Personnel
Patty Griffin – vocals, guitar
Kenny Aronoff – drums
John Catchings – strings on "Peter Pan"
David Davidson – strings on "Peter Pan"
Chris Feinstein – bass guitar
Emmylou Harris – backing vocals
Jay Joyce – guitar, keyboards, programming, producer
Mike Joyce – bass guitar
Doug Lancio – guitar
Buddy Miller – backing vocals
Julie Miller – backing vocals
Brad Pemberton – drums
Kathryn Plummer – strings on "Peter Pan"
Michael Ramos – keyboards
Giles Reaves – keyboards, programming
Frank Sass – drums
Daniel Tashian – guitar
Ty Tyler – guitar
Kristin Wilkinson – strings on "Peter Pan"
Angelo Petraglia - producer on "One Big Love"

Track information and credits adapted from the album's liner notes.

Charts

References

External links
Lyrics to the album on PattyNet.net

1998 albums
A&M Records albums
Patty Griffin albums
Albums produced by Jay Joyce